Castell Alun Football Club are a football club based in Hope, Flintshire. They currently play in the North East Wales Football League Premier Division. The home colours are Green & Black shirts, black shorts and black socks Castell Alun Colts on Football Association of Wales

History
The club joined the newly formed North East Wales Football League in 2020 as a Premier Division club.

Honours

League
 Welsh National League (Wrexham Area) Premier Division – Champions: 2002–03
 Welsh National League (Wrexham Area) Division One – Champions: 1996–97, 2005–06
 Welsh National League (Wrexham Area) Division One – Runners-up: 2018–19
 Welsh National League (Wrexham Area) Division Two – Champions: 1976–77
 Welsh National League (Wrexham Area) Division Two – Runners-up: 1989–90, 2004–05
 Welsh National League (Wrexham Area) Division Three – Champions: 1975–76
 Welsh National League (Wrexham Area) Division Four – Champions: 1974–75

Cups
 Welsh National League (Wrexham Area) Premier Division Cup – Winners: 1997–98
 Welsh National League (Wrexham Area) Division One League Cup – Winners: 1995–96, 1996–97
 Welsh National League (Wrexham Area) Division One League Cup – Runners-up: 2011–12
North East Wales FA Junior (Horace Wynne) Cup – Winners: 1974–75, 1979–80

References 

Football clubs in Wrexham
Sport in Wrexham County Borough
Welsh National League (Wrexham Area) Premier Division clubs
Sport in Flintshire
1982 establishments in Wales
North East Wales Football League clubs